Anraku-ji may refer to:

Buddhist temples in Japan:
 Anraku-ji (Kamiita) in Tokushima Prefecture
 Anraku-ji (Ueda) in Nagano Prefecture
 Anraku-ji (Hiroshima) in Hiroshima Prefecture 

Buddhist temples in Japan